Vasil Spasov (sometimes spelled Spassov; ; born 17 February 1971 in Varna) is a Bulgarian chess grandmaster. He won the World Junior Chess Championship in 1989, and the Bulgarian championship five times, in 1990, 1997, 2000, 2003 and 2008. Spasov also won the Balkan Individual Championship in 2001.

He played for the Bulgarian national team in eight Chess Olympiads (1990, 1992, 1994, 1996, 1998, 2002, 2004 and 2006) and in four European Team Chess Championships (1992, 2001, 2003 and 2005).

References

External links

Vasil Spasov chess games at 365Chess.com

1971 births
Living people
Chess grandmasters
Bulgarian chess players
World Junior Chess Champions
Chess Olympiad competitors
Sportspeople from Varna, Bulgaria